The hoary fox or hoary zorro (Lycalopex vetulus), also known as raposinha-do-campo in Brazil (Portuguese for "little meadow fox"), is a species of zorro or "false" fox endemic to Brazil. Unlike many other foxes, it feeds primarily on small invertebrates such as insects.

Description
The hoary fox has a short muzzle, small teeth, a short coat, and slender limbs. The upper part of the body is grey, and the underside of the body is cream or fawn. The tail is black on the tip with a marked dark stripe along the upper surface, which in male animals may extend all the way along the back to the nape of the neck. The ears and outside part of the legs are reddish or tawny, and the lower jaw is black. Some melanistic individuals have also been reported.

Together with its slender form, the small size of the hoary fox makes it an agile and fast-running animal, while its relatively weak teeth adapt it to feeding on invertebrates, rather than larger prey.

Behaviour and diet
Hoary foxes are nocturnal, and largely solitary outside of the breeding season. They mainly eat insects, especially termites, dung beetles, and grasshoppers, but also may eat rodents, small birds, and fruit.

Range
The hoary fox is native to south-central Brazil, although some sightings have been recorded from the north of the country, and Pleistocene fossils are known from Argentina. Although they may be found in more marginal habitats, they usually live in the cerrado, between  elevation, where open woodlands, bushlands, and savannahs that are smooth or scattered with trees occur.

No subspecies are recognized.

Reproduction
Females usually give birth to two to four pups in August to September, after a gestation period around 50 days.  The sex ratio of the pups is equal between males and females. The female prepares a den in which to give birth, sometimes using the burrows of other animals. Weaning occurs around 4 months of age.  Both parent participate in rearing of the pups.

References

hoary fox
Mammals of Brazil
Endemic fauna of Brazil
Carnivorans of South America
Least concern biota of South America
hoary fox